Medford School District may refer to these U.S. school districts:
 Medford Public Schools, Massachusetts
 Medford School District (Oregon)